Gianfranco Petris (30 August 1936 – 1 July 2018) was an Italian footballer who played as a forward.

Club career
Petris played for several clubs, including Treviso, Triestina, Fiorentina, Lazio  and Polisportiva Trani.

International career
Petris made his debut for Italy in 1958. He earned 4 caps between 1958 and 1963, scoring 1 goal.

Honours
Fiorentina
 Coppa Italia: 1960–61

References

External links
 Player profile from Federazione Italiana Giuoco Calcio website
 
 

1936 births
2018 deaths
Italian footballers
Italy international footballers
Serie A players
Serie B players
S.S. Lazio players
Treviso F.B.C. 1993 players
U.S. Triestina Calcio 1918 players
ACF Fiorentina players
Association football forwards
People from the Province of Pordenone
Footballers from Friuli Venezia Giulia